Ski Resort Extreme is a computer simulation game which puts the player in charge of creating and running a ski resort. It was developed and released in 2004 by Cat Daddy Games who also developed the very similar Ski Resort Tycoon and Ski Resort Tycoon II.

Ski Resort Extreme puts the player in the shoes of a ski resort developer whose aim is to attract varied groups of skiers and snowboarders by catering to their needs and expectations, be it ski runs, equipment, entertainment or amenities.

Resorts may be started from scratch, with more or less money depending on the difficulty level. Alternatively, players may take challenges where the task is to fix the problems of an existing resort in a specified period of time.

The game also allows the player to create a terrain with the map editor, with the option to import one's own height map.

External links

2004 video games
Business simulation games
Video games developed in the United States
Windows games
Windows-only games
Skiing mass media
Global Star Software games
Single-player video games
Cat Daddy Games games